The family of de Weck (until 1782 Weck) of Fribourg features prominently in the political and military history of Switzerland. Since the 15th century, de Wecks have served in all leading political offices of the country except that of Federal Councillor.

History
The family was founded in the 14th century by the messenger Pierre du Borjat, called Cugnyet, who became a citizen of Fribourg in 1507 and Germanized his name to Weck. By the 1520s, the Wecks were numerously represented in the city's governing bodies. Many served in the armies of France and of other European countries. A Protestant Bernese branch became extinct in the 17th century. In 1782, the Wecks obtained the right to use the nobiliary particle, de, underlining their position as part of Fribourg's patriciate.

In the 19th and 20th century, de Wecks occupied senior positions in government, the military and other public positions, including six times the office of Councillor of State (member of the cantonal government) of Fribourg. The family built and still owns several mansions. Many de Wecks now work in the legal profession.

Notable de Wecks

 Rudolf Weck (1582/83–1655), soldier, politician and diplomat
 Dominique Weck (1666–1731), Jesuit priest and professor of philosophy
 Niklaus Weck (1729–1801), general and politician
 Rodolphe de Weck (1784–1858), Councillor of State
 Louis de Weck-Reynold (1823–1880), Councillor of State
 Rodolphe de Weck-Bussy (1826–1861), Councillor of State
 Charles de Weck (1837–1931), Councillor of State
 Ernest de Weck (1860–1919), mayor of Fribourg, member of the Council of States
 Louis de Weck (1867–1916), Councillor of State
 Antoinette de Weck-de Boccard (1868–1956), painter and illustrator
 Eugène de Weck (1872–1912), painter
 René de Weck (1887–1950), Swiss ambassador to Romania
 Bernard de Weck (1890–1950), Councillor of State, member of the Council of States
 Edmond de Weck (1901–1977), footballer, member of the Swiss national team
 Philippe de Weck (1919–2009), CEO and president of UBS
 Alain de Weck (1928–2013), Professor of Immunology and Allergy at the University of Berne
 Roger de Weck (b. 1953), Director-General of the Swiss Broadcasting Corporation
 Olivier de Weck (b. 1968), Professor of Aeronautics and Astronautics and Engineering Systems at MIT
 Olivia de Weck, vice president of the gun rights advocacy group ProTell

References

People from Fribourg
Swiss noble families